John William Nicholson, FRS (1 November 1881 – 3 October 1955) was an English mathematician and physicist. Nicholson is noted as the first to create an atomic model that quantized angular momentum as h/2π. Nicholson was also the first to create a nuclear and quantum theory that explains spectral line radiation as electrons descend toward the nucleus, identifying hitherto unknown solar and nebular spectral lines. Niels Bohr quoted him in his 1913 paper of the Bohr model of the atom.

Career
Based on the results of astronomical spectroscopy of nebula he proposed in 1911 the existence of several yet undiscovered elements. Coronium with an atomic weight of 0.51282, nebulium with a weight of 1.6281 and protofluorine with a weight of 2.361.  Ira Sprague Bowen was able to attribute the spectroscopical lines of nebulium to doubly ionized oxygen making the new elements obsolete for their explanation. Some authors have pointed out the remarkable success that Nicholson's work initially experienced in spite of being founded on concepts that were eventually shown to be incorrect.

Awards and honours
Nicholson was elected a Fellow of the Royal Society of London in 1917. In 1919, Nicholson won the Adams Prize.

Papers by John William Nicholson
On electrical vibrations between confocal elliptic cylinders, with special reference to short waves. Phil. Mag. 10, 225-236. (1905)
On the diffraction of short waves by a rigid sphere. Phil. Mag. 11, 193-205.
A general solution of the electromagnetic relations. Phil. Mag. 13, 259-265.
The scattering of sound by spheroids and disks. Phil. Mag. 14, 364-377.
On the reflexion of waves from a stratum of gradually varying properties, with application to sound. Proc. Roy. Soc. A, 81, 286-299. (1908)
Inductance in parallel wires. Nature, Loud. 77, 295.
The simple equivalent of an alternating current in parallel wires. Nature, Loud. 80, 247-248.
The inductance of two parallel wires. Phil. Mag. 17, 255-275.
Inductance and resistance in telephone and other circuits. Phil. Mag. 18, 417-432. 
The scattering of light by a large conducting sphere. Proc. Lond. Math. Soc. 9, 67-80. (1910)
The effective resistance and inductance of a helical coil. Phil. Mag. 19, 77-91.
On the bending of electric waves round the earth. Phil. Mag. 19, 276-278.
On the bending of electric waves round a large sphere. Phil. Mag. 19, 516-537, and 20, 157-172.
The accelerated motion of an electrified sphere. Phil. Mag. 20, 610-618. The accelerated motion of a dielectric sphere. Phil. Mag. 20, 828-835.
A possible relation between uranium and actinium. Nature, Lond. 87, 515. (1911)
On the bending of electric waves round a large sphere. Phil. Mag. 21, 62-68, 281-295. (1912)
"The Constitution of the Solar Corona. II," Month. Not. Roy. Astr. Soc, 72 (1912), 677-692; 
"The Constitution of the Solar Corona. III," ibid., 729-739.
On the damping of the vibrations of a dielectric sphere, and the radiation from a vibrating electron. Phil. Mag. 21, 438-446.
On the number of electrons concerned in metallic conduction. Phil. Mag. 22, 245-266.
Note on optical properties of fused metals. Phil. Mag. 22, 266-268.
On the bending of electric waves round a large sphere. Phil. Mag. 24, 755-765.
The pressure of radiation on a cylindrical obstacle. Proc. Lond. Math. Soc. 11, 104-126. 
The scattering of light by a large conducting sphere (second paper). Proc. Lond. Math. Soc. 11, 277-284.
Uniform rotation, the principle of relativity, and the Michelson-Morley experiment. Phil. Mag. 24, 820-827.
Atomic models and X-ray spectra. Nature, Lond. 92, 583-584. (1914)
The constitution of atoms and molecules. Nature, Lond. 93, 268-269. (1914)
Sur les poids atomiques des elements des nebuleuses. C.R. Acad. Sci. Paris, 158, 1322-1323. (1914)
The high frequency spectra of the elements and the structure of the atom. Phil. Mag. 27, 541-564.
Atomic structure and the spectrum of helium. Phil. Mag. 28, 90-103. (With T. R. Merton.) 
On the distribution of intensity in broadened spectral lines Phil. Trans. A, 216, 459-488. (With T. R. Merton.) 
On intensity relations in the spectrum of helium. Phil. Trans. A, 220, 137-173.

References

1881 births
1955 deaths
Place of death missing
English mathematicians
Fellows of the Royal Society
People from Darlington